Night Skies is an unproduced science fiction horror film that was in development in the late 1970s. Steven Spielberg conceived the idea after Close Encounters of the Third Kind. Instead, material developed at the time was used in Poltergeist and E.T. the Extra-Terrestrial.

Origins 
Steven Spielberg came up with the idea for Night Skies in the late 1970s when Columbia Pictures wanted a sequel to Close Encounters of the Third Kind. He had no interest in a sequel, but also did not want Columbia to make a sequel without him, as Universal Pictures had done with Jaws. Instead, he came up with a horror film treatment for a Close Encounters follow-up initially titled Watch the Skies (which had also been a working title for Close Encounters). Spielberg based the story on the Kelly-Hopkinsville encounter, where a Kentucky family claimed that they had been terrorized by gremlin-like aliens. Spielberg had heard the story from UFOlogist J. Allen Hynek while doing research for Close Encounters.

In Spielberg's original treatment for Watch the Skies, eleven malicious extraterrestrial scientists try to communicate with chickens, cows, and other livestock in an attempt to discover which of Earth's animal species are sentient, before turning their unwelcome attentions to a human family and dissecting their farm animals. Fueling Hollywood rumors about the film, NASA announced that Spielberg paid to reserve cargo space for the 1980 inaugural Space Shuttle flight, in order to film the Earth and its Moon from orbit for the film's opening sequence. Spielberg stated that he would produce Watch the Skies but not direct it, as he was under contract to direct his next film for Universal.

John Sayles and Rick Baker 
Spielberg at first wanted Lawrence Kasdan to flesh out his Watch the Skies treatment into a fully-fledged script, but Kasdan was too busy writing The Empire Strikes Back, so Spielberg turned to John Sayles (who had written Joe Dante's Roger Corman-produced Jaws spoof Piranha, which Spielberg had loved). Watch the Skies was renamed Night Skies because someone owned the rights to the words "watch the skies" (which was the last line in The Thing from Another World). Some called Night Skies "Straw Dogs with aliens", but Sayles says his inspiration was the 1939 western film Drums Along the Mohawk. Sayles even named one of the aliens Scar (a character who was said to be "a real badass") after a Comanche Indian badguy in the John Wayne film The Searchers. Spielberg suggested that Tobe Hooper, best known for directing and co-writing The Texas Chain Saw Massacre,  direct the film. The film was scheduled to begin shooting after Spielberg returned from filming Raiders of the Lost Ark. Spielberg chose make-up and special effects master Rick Baker (who at the time was also working on John Landis's An American Werewolf in London) to design and create the alien creatures.

Rick Baker built a working prototype of the lead alien that cost $70,000 and thrilled Spielberg and Kathleen Kennedy when they saw a videotape of it while filming Raiders of the Lost Ark in London. In mid-1980, Sayles delivered his first (and, in the end, only) draft of the screenplay, which featured five aliens (cut down from the original eleven) including the aforementioned Scar, Squirt, and Buddy, who was kind and befriended the human family's autistic son. Sayles's script opened with Scar (who was described in the script as having a beak-like mouth and eyes like a grasshopper's) killing farm animals by touching them with a long bony finger which gave off an eerie light, and ended with Buddy, marooned on Earth by his mean-spirited peers, cowering under the shadow of an approaching hawk. Although there were some differences over the new concept, Spielberg and Sayles parted amicably and the film project continued on.

Origin of E.T. 
While Baker worked on the aliens, Spielberg was having second thoughts about Night Skies. "I might have taken leave of my senses. Throughout [the production of] Raiders, I was in between killing Nazis and blowing up flying wings and having Harrison Ford in all this high serialized adventure, I was sitting there in the middle of Tunisia, scratching my head and saying, 'I've got to get back to the tranquillity, or at least the spirituality, of Close Encounters. While on the set of Raiders, Spielberg read the Night Skies script to Melissa Mathison (who was there to see her then-boyfriend and future husband Harrison Ford) and she cried after hearing it because "the idea of an alien creature who was benevolent, tender, emotional and sweet... and the idea of the creature's striking up a relationship with a child who came from a broken home was very affecting".

When Spielberg came back from Tunisia and Hawaii (where the opening of Raiders of the Lost Ark was filmed), he eagerly closed the door on Night Skies and began planning the film Mathison had dubbed ET and Me, released to massive success 18 months later as E.T. the Extra-Terrestrial. Rick Baker, who had spent $700,000 on unused Night Skies designs, models and animatronics, had a huge fight with Spielberg, which led to Carlo Rambaldi (who had previously done alien creature designs for Close Encounters) doing creature designs for E.T.. John P. Veitch (then-president of Columbia's worldwide productions) and Frank Price (then president of Columbia) were also unhappy with the emergence of E.T. and did not want to make "a wimpy Walt Disney movie". In February 1981 (six months after Columbia's desire for a Close Encounters follow-up had been fulfilled by Close Encounters of the Third Kind: The Special Edition), Columbia put the Night Skies/E.T. project in turnaround. Sid Sheinberg (Spielberg's long-time friend and then-president of MCA, the then-parent company of Universal Studios) bought the Night Skies/E.T. project from Columbia, repaying them the $1 million that had been used thus far to develop the project and making a deal in which Columbia would retain 5% of the film's net profits. (Veitch later said that "I think that year we made more on that picture than we did on any of our films.")

Legacy 
Although Night Skies as a film would never reach production status, it helped inspire not only E.T., but also Poltergeist (which had a family terrorized by paranormal forces and Spielberg hired Tobe Hooper to direct), Spielberg and Mathison's proposed E.T. II: Nocturnal Fears (which had malicious, animal-mutilating cousins of E.T.), Gremlins (which had one innocent and kind member of a species of otherwise mean-spirited creatures as well as being able to see Watch the Skies being advertised on a movie theater marquee, co-billed with A Boy's Life, the working title for E.T.), Critters (which had a farm family terrorized by cattle-mutilating aliens), Signs, and Spielberg's War of the Worlds adaptation.  Sayles, meanwhile, riffed on E.T.'''s success with 1984's The Brother from Another Planet, a socio-political take on the story of a benevolent alien stranded on Earth.

 See also 
 Dark Skies (1996), a TV show with a similar premise
 Dark Skies (2013), an unrelated sci-fi horror film with a similar premise.
 Steven Spielberg's unrealized projects

 References 
 Notes 

 Bibliography 

 Hughes, David. The Greatest Sci-Fi Movies Never Made Chicago: Chicago Review Press, 2002. .
 Sinyard, Neil. Films of Steven Spielberg. London: Bison Books, 1987. .
 Thomson, David. "Alien resurrection.". The Guardian'', March 15, 2002. Retrieved: April 11, 2008.

External links 
 cinefex: Turn on the Heartlight, Inside E.T.
 E.T.: The Extra-Terrestrial

Cancelled films
E.T. the Extra-Terrestrial
Unproduced screenplays